The PNLD (Police National Legal Database) is the leading online police information resource of criminal justice legislation. PNLD's legal database contains Acts of Parliament, Common Law, Regulations, Orders and Byelaws, Case Summaries and the National Standard Offence Wordings and Codes that are used throughout the court system of England and Wales.

PNLD is a national organisation governed by West Yorkshire Police. PNLD receives no funding from central government and relies upon subscription income alone. In addition to all 43 Home Office police forces in England and Wales and the British Transport Police, PNLD's subscribers include the Crown Prosecution Service, the Independent Office for Police Conduct, His Majesty's Courts and Tribunals Service and other organisations with a duty to investigate and prosecute offences.

Background
PNLD was developed using the criminal law notes used by the Detective Training Wing of the West Yorkshire Police. By 1994 advances in IT made it possible to create a computerized 'database' of legal information, case law and national standard offence wordings which could be readily updated in line with changes in legislation. The resource was initially rolled out to a consortium of nineteen forces, before gaining accreditation as a Home Office product under the umbrella of PITO (Police Information Technology Organization). By 2001, all 43 Home Office police Forces had become subscribers.

With the growth of the policing partners including regulatory authorities, it became clear that PNLD was needed throughout the Criminal Justice sector and could be made available to these organizations via the internet. PNLD then looked to partner with a technology company which would assist them in creating an online resource, as well as helping them to develop new services. They chose to work with PDMS Limited and in 2004 an internet version of the PNLD became available on subscription.

The content of PNLD is updated and expanded by a small team of Legal Advisers, and there is now legislation available which supports not only police users, but also a broad range of professionals from the Trading Standards service, Ofcom, the NHS, and various colleges and universities.

Other Products and Services
Other information resources were subsequently created by PNLD's IT partners, PDMS. Using the same technology, together they have provided solutions for a range of information needs.

In 2005, the public-facing Ask the Police website was launched by Hazel Blears MP, the then Policing Minister. This information resource contains answers to over 900 questions about the police, and policing matters generally, which members of the public most frequently ask. By providing nationally consistent answers to their questions, Ask the Police enables the public to find the information they need at a time to suit them, and reduces the number of non-emergency calls to police forces.

A Scottish version of the site was launched in 2010 to reflect their unique legislation and procedures.

In addition to their online resources, PNLD's legal team have authored and contributed to various titles within the range of OUP's Blackstone's Handbooks:

 Police Operational Handbook: Law
 Blackstone's Counter-Terrorism Handbook

PNLD's annual Criminal Law conference has been run since 2005 and continues to expand their commitment to education by providing high calibre legal presentations. Previous conferences have been hosted at Police Mutual HQ and sponsored by Oxford University Press.

Previous Products and Services

In 2014, PNLD developed a free to access online resource that provides collective information for victims and witnesses with the Police and Crime Commissioner for West Yorkshire. The website launched in October 2014 with the support of Baroness Helen Newlove, the Victims’ Commissioner for England and Wales. The website contains 400 Q&A's on how victims and witnesses should be treated within the criminal justice system under the Victims’ Code and the Witness Charter, with links to national supporting organisations. This site is no longer available nationally and was returned to the OPCC West Yorkshire.

PNLD launched a Motoring & The Law app in November 2015 with the support of the Cabinet Office in an effort to make law more accessible and simpler to understand, the content is now included within the legal database.

Publications:
 Blackstone's Handbook of Ports and Border Security 
 Blackstone's Handbook of Cyber Crime Investigation

References
https://www.pnld.co.uk/

https://www.askthe.police.uk/ 
https://www.askthe.scottish.police.uk/
https://www.pnld.co.uk/products-services?id=1

Databases in England
Government databases in the United Kingdom
Law enforcement in the United Kingdom